Twin (sometimes written as TWIN) is a Swedish record production and songwriting team, consisting of Niclas Molinder and Joacim Persson.

Production and songwriting discography

2001

Charlotte Perrelli - Miss Jealousy 
 02. "Miss Jealousy"
 06. "One Kiss Away"

2002

Amber - Naked 
 07. "Sex Without Sex"

Da Buzz - Wanna Be with Me 
 05. "Keep On Lovin' Me"
 07. "Wonder Where You Are"

Gloria Gaynor - I Wish You Love 
 01. "Gotta Be Forever"
 05. "All the Man That I Need"

2003

No Angels - Pure 
 02. "Eleven Out of Ten"
 08. "Feelgood Lies"

Sophie Monk - Calendar Girl 
 05. "Love Thing"
 09. "Step Back to Love"

Play - Replay 
 08. "11 Out of 10"

Snap! - The Cult of Snap! 
 09. "When You're Near"

S Club 8 - Sundown 
 09. "Sundown"

Belinda - Belinda 
 01. "Lo Siento"

2004

American Juniors - American Juniors 
 09. "Sundown"

Bubbles - Blow The Spot 
 01. "Blow The Spot"

Die Schlümpfe - The Smurfs 
 02. "Einmal"

Charlotte Perrelli - Gone Too Long 
 07. "All by Myself"
 10. "Tell Me"

Sandy Mölling - Unexpected 
 02. "Say It Again"
 03. "Unnatural Blonde"
 05. "Tell Me"
 07. "Sorry, You've Got the Wrong Girl"
 09. "Do It All Over"
 11. "All Eyes On You"

2005

Agnes - Agnes 
 01. "Stranded"

Bratz - Rock Angelz 
 03. "I Don't Care"
 04. "All About You"
 05. "Who I Am"
 06. "So What"
 09. "Lookin' Good"
 10. "Rock the World"
 14. "Hey (When the Angelz Play)"

2006

Sandy Mölling - Frame of Mind 
 12. "Speed Of Love"

Helena Paparizou - The Game of Love 
 08. "Heroes"

Velvet - Finally 
 03. "Mi Amore"
 04. "Doin' It"

Bratz - Forever Diamondz 
 01. "Ooooh Fashion"
 02. "Wazz Up"
 03. "Keep It Up"
 04. "Best Friends"
 07. "Express Yourself"
 14. "Que Tal"

2007

Ashley Tisdale - Headstrong 
 04. "Be Good to Me"
 05. "Not Like That"
 09. "Goin' Crazy"

Dannii Minogue - Unleashed 
 19. "Via L'amour" (iTunes Bonus track)

Danny - Heart Beats 
 10. "Together Some Day"
 11. "Stay"

No Angels - Destiny 
 01. "Goodbye to Yesterday"
 05. "Maybe"
 08. "Back Off"

Tiffany Affair - Over It 
 01. "Over It"

2008

Velvet - The Queen 
 09. "Déjà Vu"

Darin - Flashback 
 12. "What If"

The Cheetah Girls - The Cheetah Girls: One World
 01. "Cheetah Love"
 07. "I'm the One"

2009

Ashley Tisdale - Guilty Pleasure 
 01. "Acting Out"
 02. "It's Alright, It's OK"
 04. "Overrated"
 08. "What If"
 09. "Erase And Rewind"
 13. "Crank It Up"
 16. "Watcha Waiting For"
 00. "History" (unreleased)

V Factory - Untitled debut album 
 00. "Love Struck"

2010

Camp Rock 2: The Final Jam - soundtrack 
 13. "Walkin' In My Shoes" (bonus track)

Charice - Charice 
 01. "Pyramid"
 11. "I Did It for You"

Avalon High soundtrack 
 "Destiny" - performed by Play

2011

Lemonade Mouth Soundtrack 
 01. Determinate
 02. Breakthrough

Willow Smith - "Willow" 
 02. "21st Century Girl"
 00. "Fireball (featuring Nicki Minaj)"

Shake It Up: Break It Down Soundtrack 
 10. Roll The Dice
 11. Just Wanna Dance
 12. Our Generation

Lady Gaga 
 01. Marry The Night David Jost & Twin Radio Remix

2012

Blush - Single from the album Shake It Up: Live 2 Dance 
 01. Up, Up, and Away

Shake It Up: Live 2 Dance Soundtrack 
 04. Up, Up, and Away
 06. Make Your Mark
 11. Bring the Fire

References

Record production duos
Swedish record producers
Songwriting teams